Pocestë is a community in the Korçë County, Albania. At the 2015 local government reform it became part of the municipality Maliq.

References

Populated places in Maliq
Villages in Korçë County